Kar Dam, is an earthfill dam on Kar river near Wardha in state of Maharashtra in India.

Specifications

Purpose
 Irrigation

See also
 Dams in Maharashtra
 List of reservoirs and dams in India

References

Dams in Wardha district
Dams completed in 2000
2000 establishments in Maharashtra